The Jagiełło Oak is the most noted of the Białowieża Forest oaks. The fallen trunk can still be seen in the Białowieża National Park.

King Władysław II Jagiełło is said to have rested beneath the tree before the Battle of Grunwald in 1410 – however at its death the tree is thought to have been no more than 450 years old, which would mean it did not begin growing until around 1524.

External links
Oaks in Białowieza Forest at Bialowieza.pl
 The Jagiełło Oak in photographs
 Pierwszy w dostojności między drzewami (The first among trees) at Białowieża National Park website

Individual oak trees
Landmarks in Poland
Natural monuments of Poland
Białowieża Forest
1970s individual tree deaths
Individual trees in Poland